Negative Format is an EBM/trance band formed by Alex Matheu in 1996.  For live performances, the band includes Rashree and Brian Matson.

In 2004, Alex created The Parallel Project, an album combining his music with the vocals of other industrial artists, including Salva Maine, Sandrine Gouriou, Ned Kirby, Tom Shear, Rashree Matson, Daniel Myer, Jennifer Parkin, Clint Carney, Darrin Huss, Courtney Bangert, Victoria Lloyd, Mark Jackson, Kristy Venrick, and G. Wygonik. In 2000, he released a song on Inception Records compilation 'Counterbalance Vol. 1' as Parallel titled Parallax featuring Ben Schingel and Daniel Paradise, this song was a precursor to The Parallel Project.

Since 2008 he also creates IDM under the moniker Distraub

Discography

Albums

 Pathologic Syndrome (Hypnotic Trancez, May 1997)
 Result of a New Culture (Gashed!, November 1998; Zoth Ommog, April 1999) – #16 CMJ RPM Charts
 Distant Pulses (Gashed!, May 2000) – #17 CMJ RPM Charts
 Static (Sector 9 Studios, July 2002)
 UTurn: An Exploration In Trance (with Massiv in Mensch, Artoffact Records, 2002)
 Cipher Method (Out Of Line, Sector 9 Studios, February 2003)
 Moving Past The Boundaries (Metropolis Records, September 2005)
 Gradients (Metropolis Records, April 2008)

Singles and EPs

 Random Diversions (Hypnotic Trancez, 1997)
 Static (Out Of Line, Sector 9 Studios, 2002)
 "Axiom" (Sector 9 Studios, 2012)

Compilations
 "Gaia's Will" appears on "Sonic Assault - Zombie Commandos From Hell" (2002)
 "Pathogen" appears on "Industrial Attack Vol.1" (2008)
 "Photon Ring" appears on "Industrial Attack Vol.2"(2008)

References

External links 
 
 
 

Electro-industrial music groups
American trance music groups
Musical groups established in 1996
Metropolis Records artists
Zoth Ommog Records artists